Charles Henry Yaldren (8 December 1891 — 23 October 1916) was an English first-class cricketer and soldier.

The son of Charles Henry Yaldren senior, he was born at Southampton in December 1891. He made a single appearance in first-class cricket for Hampshire against Cambridge University at Southampton in 1912. Described as a "useful bowler and tail-end bat", he was run out for 8 runs in his only first-class innings, while with his bowling he took one wicket in the match, that of Geoffrey Hopley. Yaldren served in the First World War as a private in the 1st Battalion, Royal Hampshire Regiment. He was killed in action at Thiepval on 23 October 1916, during the First Battle of the Somme. His body was never recovered, but he is commemorated at the Thiepval Memorial.

References

External links

1891 births
1916 deaths
Cricketers from Southampton
English cricketers
Hampshire cricketers
Military personnel from Southampton
Royal Hampshire Regiment soldiers
British Army personnel of World War I
British military personnel killed in the Battle of the Somme